Amusia is a genus of African ground spiders that was first described by Albert Tullgren in 1910.  it contains only two species: A. cataracta and A. murina.

References

Araneomorphae genera
Gnaphosidae